Oakwood Cemetery may refer to any of at least 200 cemeteries named "Oakwood" or "Oak Wood" in the United States, including:
Historic Oakwood Cemetery, in Raleigh, North Carolina, also known as "Oakwood Cemetery"
Oakwood Cemetery (Austin, Texas), originally called "City Cemetery"
Oakwood Cemetery (Fremont, Ohio)
Oakwood Cemetery (Jefferson, Texas)
Oakwood Cemetery (Lansing Township, Minnesota)
Oakwood Cemetery (Niagara Falls, New York)
Oakwood Cemetery (Parsons, Kansas)
Oakwood Cemetery (Red Wing, Minnesota), listed on the National Register of Historic Places (NRHP) in Goodhue County
Oakwood Cemetery (Richmond, Virginia)
Oakwood Cemetery (Syracuse, New York), listed on the NRHP in Onondaga County
Oakwood Cemetery (Troy, New York), listed on the NRHP in Rensselaer County
Oakwood Cemetery (Waco, Texas)
Oakwood Memorial Park Cemetery, in Chatsworth, Los Angeles, California

See also
Oakland Cemetery (disambiguation)
Oak Woods Cemetery, Chicago, Illinois
Oakwood Cemetery Chapel (disambiguation)